Radiotelevisió Valenciana was in charge of the broadcasting of television and radio in the Valencian Community in Spain.

History
The Statute of Autonomy of the Valencian Community of 1982 makes possible the creation of means of social communication destined to promote intercommunication between Valencians and to enhance their cultural and linguistic identity.

In July 1984, the Valencian Courts approved the Law for the Creation of Valencian Radio and Television, a necessary instrument to put into practice one of the projects most shared and expected by the various social and political sectors of the Community. Article 11, c) of Law 7/1984 of the Generalitat Valenciana of July 4, by which RTVV is created, establishes the internal regulation through the Regulations developed by the General Directorate, establishing the management of the services of Radio and Television through two public companies in the form of joint-stock companies, Televisió Autonòmica Valenciana SA and Ràdio Autonomia Valenciana S.A. Despite being two different companies, they depend on the same body, this being RTVV. The capital of the company is exclusively contributed by the Valencian Government, in accordance with said law.

On 10 March 1987, the infrastructure works of the RTVV program production center, located in Burjassot, on the outskirts of the city of Valencia, began, as well as facilities.

In March 1988, the RTVV Board of Directors was constituted. The Council was made up of eleven members appointed, according to the Law of Creation of the Entity, by the Valencian Courts, and the duration of their mandate coincides with that of the corresponding legislature.

On 9 October 1989, Canal Nou began broadcasting.

In April of the same year, the Board of Directors proposed to the Council of the Generalitat Valenciana the appointment of the first General Director of the entity.

The entity's budget in 2011 was €120 million, being lowered in 2012 to €98.7 million.

In January 2012, an employment regulation file (ERE) was announced for the RTVV.

In October 2013, the public channel Canal Nou was renamed simply Nou, but the name is short-lived, due to the closure of RTVV. This year's budget is € 78 million.

On 29 June 2016, the Tax Agency published a list of debtors where RTVV appears with an amount pending payment of € 1.3 million.

Dissolution 
In July 2012, in the midst of the ongoing financial crisis, RTVV announced a labor force adjustment plan, firing 1,198 of its 1,660 employees. Trade unions CCOO and CGT challenged the measure, and on 5 November 2013 it was nullified by the National Court. Claiming that reinstating the employees was untenable, the Generalitat Valenciana closed down RTVV that same day. Nou TV's last broadcast ended abruptly when Spanish police pulled the plug at 12:19 on 29 November 2013.

Televisió Valenciana (TVV) 
It began test broadcasts on 2 September 1989 under president Joan Lerma, regular broadcasts began on 9 October 1989.
Nou Televisió – the first channel of TVV; launched as "Canal Nou".
Canal Nou Dos - the second channel of TVV, broadcast informative, documentary and cultural, as well as sports, programs
Nou 24 – the third channel of TVV, broadcast news, and information; launched as "24/9", then re-branded as "Canal Nou 24".
Canal Nou Internacional - the fourth channel of TVV, distributing Valencian programming to the Valencian community around the world, as well as promoting it to the rest of the citizens of those areas

Ràdio Autonomia Valenciana (RAV) 
Nou Ràdio – www.radionou.com
Nou Sí Ràdio – www.siradio.com

References

External links

 Official site of RTVV

 
1988 establishments in the Valencian Community
2013 disestablishments in the Valencian Community
Defunct radio networks
Defunct television networks
Former state media
FORTA
Mass media companies established in 1988
Mass media companies disestablished in 2013
Spanish radio networks
Television networks in Spain
Television channels and stations established in 1988
Television channels and stations disestablished in 2013
Mass media in the Valencian Community
Radio stations established in 1984
Radio stations disestablished in 2013